32 Levels is the debut studio album by American record producer Clams Casino. It was released on July 15, 2016, by Columbia Records. The album contains guest appearances from Lil B, ASAP Rocky, Vince Staples, Sam Dew, Mikky Ekko, Kelela, and Samuel T. Herring, among others.

Critical reception

32 Levels received generally positive reviews from critics. At Metacritic, which assigns a normalized rating out of 100 to reviews from mainstream publications, the album received an average score of 76, based on 19 reviews. Writing for Exclaim!, Stephen Carlick called the album "an adventurous but inconsistent affair".

Track listing

Notes
  signifies a co-producer
  signifies an additional producer
 "Level 1" features vocals by Lil B
 "Be Somebody" features vocals by Mikky Ekko, and additional vocals by Sterling Fox

Charts

References

External links
 

2016 debut albums
Clams Casino albums
Columbia Records albums
Witch house (genre) albums